Ghiyath ud-din Baysunghur, commonly known as Baysonqor or Baysongor, Baysonghor or (incorrectly) as Baysunqar, also called Sultan Bāysonḡor Bahādor Khan  (1397–1433) was a prince of the Timurid dynasty. He was known as a patron of arts and architecture, the leading patron of the Persian miniature in Iran, commissioning the Baysunghur Shahnameh and other works, as well as being a prominent calligrapher. 

Baysunghur was a son of Shah Rukh, the ruler of Iran and Transoxiana, and Shah Rukh's most prominent wife, Gawhar Shad.

In the view of modern historians, Baysunghur was actually a better statesman than his more famous elder brother, Ulugh Beg, who  inherited Shah Rukh's throne, but who "must have envied his younger brother, Baisunghur, whom his father never saddled with major responsibilities, which left him free to build his elegant madrasas in Herat, gather his ancient books, assemble his artists, and drink". He was well-versed in Persian, Arabic, as well his native Chagatai. He was a patron of Persian historians, including Hafiz-i Abru (died 1430), who dedicated his book Zubdat al-tawārīkh-i bāysunghurī to him.

Baysunghur was living in Herat as governor by 1417. After taking Tabriz, in 1421 he brought back to Herat a group of Tabrizi artists and calligraphers, formerly working for Ahmad Jalayir, who he installed in Herat to add to his existing artists from Shiraz. They became the most important school of artists in Iran, merging the two styles.

Personal life
Consorts
Baysunghur had five wives:
Jan Malik Agha, daughter of Amir Chulpan Qauchin;
Gawhar Nasab Agha, a lady from Khwarezm;
Khandan Agha;
Afaq Agha;
Shah Begi Agha;

Sons
Baysunghur had three sons:
Ala al-Dawla Mirza - with Jan Malik Agha;
Abul-Qasim Babur Mirza - with Gawhar Nasab Agha;
Sultan Muhammad Mirza - with Khandan Agha;

Daughters
Baysunghur had eight daughters:
Ruqaiya Begi Begum - with Shah Begi Agha;
Fatima Sultan Begum - with Gawhar Nasab Agha;
Zuhra Begi Begum - with Gawhar Nasab Agha;
Aisha Begi Begum - with Afaq Agha, married to Sultan Masud Mirza, son of Sayorghatmish Mirza, son of Shah Rukh;
Sa'adat Begi Begum - with Khandan Agha;
Bakht Daulat Begum;
Payanda Sultan Begum;
Sahib Sultan Begum, married to Muhammad Khalil Mirza son of Muhammad Jahangir Mirza, son of Muhammad Sultan Mirza, son of Jahangir Mirza;

References

Sources
 
 

Timurid dynasty
People from Herat
1397 births
1433 deaths
Calligraphers of the medieval Islamic world